The Ghost Note Symphonies, Vol. 1 is a compilation album by American rock band Rise Against. It was released on July 27, 2018. The album features reimagined versions of previously released Rise Against songs, with acoustic orchestration and alternative instrumentation.

Rise Against recorded songs for The Ghost Note Symphonies, Vol. 1 at the Blasting Room in Fort Collins, Colorado, with producers Bill Stevenson and Jason Livermore. To promote the album, the band released an acoustic rendition of their 2017 song, "House on Fire" on May 18.

On June 8 the band released an acoustic rendition of Like the Angel, promoted by the related videoclip. On July 13, an acoustic rendition of the song Voices Off Camera was released. The original version of this song is also part of the album Revolutions per Minute and was announced via a video trailer on the band's Facebook page.

Background
In a 2018 interview with HMV, singer Tim McIlrath noted how Rise Against fans had been asking for an acoustic album for several years, and although the band considered recording one, they did not have enough time in their schedule to properly record one. After the release of Wolves in June 2017, the band members had some free time to record new material, and they decided to record a couple of acoustic bonus tracks. Rise Against booked a twelve day long session at the Blasting Room with producers Bill Stevenson and Jason Livermore.

The album's title is derived from a lyrics from "Parts Per Million," a song from Wolves.

Track listing
All lyrics written by Tim McIlrath; all music composed by Rise Against.

Personnel
Credits adapted from Allmusic

Rise Against
 Tim McIlrath – lead vocals, acoustic guitar, ukulele
 Zach Blair – acoustic guitar
 Joe Principe – acoustic bass guitar
 Brandon Barnes – drums, percussion

Additional musicians
 Chris Beeble – string arrangements
 Andrew Berlin – acoustic guitar, piano, string arrangements
 Jeb Bows – violin
 John Grigsby – upright bass
 Phil Norman – cello
 Adrienne Short – violin 

Production
 Bill Stevenson – production, engineering
 Jason Livermore – production, engineering, mixing, mastering
 Chris Beeble – engineering, production
 Andrew Berlin – engineering, production

Additional personnel
 Nicole Frantz – creative director
 Ryan Del Vecchio – A&R
 David Wolter – A&R

Charts

References

2018 compilation albums
Albums produced by Bill Stevenson (musician)
Rise Against albums
Virgin Records compilation albums